The statue of Ivan Konev was a monument to Soviet general Ivan Konev that was erected in Prague in 1980. In the late 2010s, it became a subject of controversy within Czech Republic–Russia relations, resulting in its removal in 2020.

History

The statue was unveiled during the Victory Day celebrations on 9 May 1980, and intended to commemorate Soviet Marshal Ivan Stepanovich Konev, who commanded Red Army troops that occupied Prague from the hands of the Nazis near to the end of World War II. It depicted a life-sized figure of Konev, holding in his hand a bouquet of lilacs, which civilians reportedly presented to the Red Army when it entered Czechoslovakia in May 1945. It was located in Prague district 6 (Interbrigády Square, Bubeneč area). It was designed by Czech sculptor  and architect Vratislav Růžička.

After the Revolutions of 1989 and the Czech transition to a democratic government, it became a subject of frequent vandalism, particularly on the anniversary of the Prague Spring. The local government proposed relocating the monument to the Russian embassy.

In 2018, the city added explanatory text to the monument, stating that he participated in the suppression of the Hungarian Revolution of 1956 and the Prague Spring. The explanatory text has been criticized by the Russian embassy. The diplomatic spat over this text has been one of the issues leading to the deterioration of Czech-Russia relations.

On 21 August 2019 an unknown individual spray-painted "No to the blood-covered marshal, we shall not forget" on the statue. The mayor of Prague 6 said that he is considering leaving the monument uncleaned, remarking that "red, after all, means beautiful in Russian". By September 2019, the Prague municipal authorities had covered up the monument, no longer willing to incur the cost of cleaning it up. The move proved to be controversial, as within days the tarpaulin covering the monument had been torn down three times; two individuals, described by Czech media as "pro-Russian activists", were detained by the police.

The monument was finally removed on 3 April 2020 during lockdown and the state of emergency imposed due to the COVID-19 pandemic in the Czech Republic, with the Czech president Miloš Zeman criticizing the removal as "an abuse of the state of emergency". Within days, the Investigative Committee of the Russian Federation announced it would begin a symbolic investigation of the alleged "defiling of symbols of Russia's military glory". The mayor of Prague district 6 subsequently went into hiding under police protection, out of concerns of an alleged saxitoxin and ricin poison plot for his actions regarding the statue. The poison threat was later revealed to have been a hoax originating from the Russian embassy. The Czech government expelled two Russian embassy members; Andrey Konchakov, who headed the Russian Center for Science and Culture (Rossotrudnichestvo) in Prague; and his subordinate Igor Rybakov, an FSB officer. Russia has also opened criminal proceedings, but the Czech authorities stated that Russia has no legal jurisdiction in this case.

Shortly after removal, local Prague authorities announced they are considering displaying the monument in the planned , while the Russian and Czech ministries noted they are also discussing plans to have the statue transferred to Russia.

In June 2020, during an arts and landscape festival in Prague, 12 small temporary statues of Ivan Konev were unveiled, painted to look like figures such as Batman, Superman, the Joker, and Adolf Hitler.

For thirty days in December 2022, the plinth was occupied by Ahriman the Demon, a statue created at an international convention of blacksmiths, depicting Vladimir Putin as a goblin wielding a gas tap and making a Nazi salute. It was to be auctioned off to support Ukraine during the Russian invasion, an effort organized by businessman Dalibor Dědek.

See also
Monument to Soviet Tank Crews

Notes

References

Monuments and memorials in Prague
1980 establishments in Czechoslovakia
2020 disestablishments in the Czech Republic
1980 sculptures
World War II memorials
Czech Republic–Russia relations
Statues removed in 2020
Outdoor sculptures in Prague
Vandalized works of art
Czechoslovakia–Soviet Union relations
20th-century architecture in the Czech Republic